Rajinimurugan is a 2016 Indian Tamil-language masala film written and directed by Ponram, and produced by director N. Lingusamy and N. Subash Chandra Bose under the banner Thirrupathi Brothers. This is the second directorial venture of Ponram, after Varuthapadaatha Valibar Sangam (2013). It stars Sivakarthikeyan in dual roles for the first time in his career; as the title character, a jobless youth who decides to sell his grandfather's property to become rich; and a cameo appearance as Bosepandi from the previous film. Keerthy Suresh and Soori portray the lead roles, while Rajkiran, Samuthirakani and Achyuth Kumar play supporting roles.

The film features soundtrack composed by D. Imman, with all lyrics were written by Yugabharathi. The cinematography was handled by Balasubramaniem, and edited by Vivek Harshan. Filming took place extensively in Madurai and Karaikkudi. The film's principal photography was commenced on 25 August 2014, and the shooting completed in March 2015.

Rajinimurugan, which faced multiple postponements, released on 14 January 2016, during the Pongal festival. The film grossed .

The film was remade in Kannada as Raj Vishnu in 2017.

Plot
Rajini Murugan  is an unemployed youth from Madurai who spends his days roaming around with his best friend Thotathree  and supplying food to his grandfather Ayyankalai, a highly respected gentleman who has large properties of land. Ayyankalai wants to divide all his properties among his children and grandchildren, but except Rajini Murugan and his father Malligarajan, who is the headmaster of the local school, the rest of the family is settled abroad and never visit Madurai.

Meanwhile, following the advice of an astrologer (who claimed that Rajini Murugan will get married and be rich within three months), Rajini Murugan starts wooing his childhood sweetheart Karthika Devi. Karthika's father Neelakandan, an ardent fan of Rajinikanth, was the best friend of Malligarajan and had given Rajini Murugan his name when he was born, but fell out with Malligarajan and his family due to a misunderstanding involving Rajini Murugan and Karthika when they were youngsters. Since then, Rajini Murugan and Karthika are not on speaking terms, and Neelakandan forbids any sort of contact between the two. Nevertheless, Rajini Murugan opens a tea stall outside Karthika's house to stay close to her and follows her day and night. The stall is later destroyed by a customer who pulls down the shop in the process of taking a banana. Later, he and Thothathree start a real estate company. A gangster "Ezhrai" Mookan, whose only work is to extort 100,000 from businessmen, tries to swindle the same amount from Rajini Murugan, but fails and ends up paying 100,000 to him.

Ayyankalai, who is fed up with Rajini Murugan's antics, decides to immediately divide his properties so that Rajini Murugan can benefit from his share of the property. He fakes his death, which forces his children and grandchildren to come to Madurai. Mookan claims that he too is a grandson of Ayyankalai (through the son of Ayyankalai's first wife) and starts demanding his share of the property. This leads to confrontation between Rajini Murugan and Mookan and their feud is soon brought before the panchayat. The panchayat declares the verdict in favour of Ayyankalai and Rajini Murugan. Mookan, accepting defeat, receives 100,000 from Rajini Murugan as compensation. It is then revealed that Mookan staged the whole drama to get back his 100,000 from Rajini Murugan. Meanwhile, Karthika accepts Rajini Murugan's love and Neelakandan also begins to approve their relationship.

In the end, Ayyankalai reveals that he does have a grandson through his first wife's son. The grandson is revealed to be none other than Bosepandi from Varuthapadatha Valibar Sangam. Bosepandi refuses to accept his share of his grandfather's property, advising him and his family not to sell the property and instead convert it into a 5-star hotel and hand it over to Rajini Murugan. Ayyankalai and Rajini Murugan agree with him.

Cast

 Sivakarthikeyan as Rajini Murugan  and Bosepandi (cameo)
 Soori as Thotathree, Rajini Murugan's best friend
 Keerthy Suresh as Karthika Devi (KD), Rajini Murugan's love interest
 Rajkiran as Ayyankalai, Rajini Murugan's grandfather
 Samuthirakani as "Ezhrai" Mookan
 G. Gnanasambandam as Malligairajan, Rajini Murugan's father
 Achyuth Kumar as Neelakandan, Karthika's father, Malligairajan's friend, and a hardcore Rajini fan
 Dheepa Ramanujam as Rajini Murugan's mother
 Manobala as Kunjithapatham, Audi Car Showroom Manager
 Namo Narayana as Thangavel, Panchayath party
 Vela Ramamoorthy as Chellakarupan, Head of Usilampatti Panchayath
 Andreanne Nouyrigat as Andrea
 Subramaniapuram Raja as Thangapandi, Panchayath party
 Supergood Subramani as Police Officer
 Hello Kandasamy as astrologer 
 Thavasi as Madasamy
 Meena Vemuri as Rajini Murugan's Aunt
 Bhawana Aneja
 Naadodigal Gopal as Thotathree's father
 Gajaraj as Rajinimurugan's relative
 Darshan as Rajini Murugan's Cousin Brother
 Baba Bhaskar (special appearance in the song "Yennama Ipadi Panreengalaema")

Production

Development
Following the success of his debut directorial Varuthapadaatha Vaalibar Sangam, director Ponram announced his next project, which also stars Sivakarthikeyan in the lead role. N. Lingusamy bankrolled the project under his banner Thirupathi Brothers. The project was announced in August 2013. D. Imman was selected to compose the music for the film and Balasubramaniem was signed in for the film as the cinematographer. Both were worked on Ponram's earlier film Varuthapadaatha Vaalibar Sangam. Sivakarthikeyan was reported to play a real-estate broker in the film.

Casting
Reports stated that Nazriya Nazim and Samantha Ruth Prabhu were among the forerunners for the lead female role, later they were replaced by Tamannaah. In August 2013, Tamannah opted out of the project, due to some issues. The female lead role went to Lakshmi Menon. However, she was subsequently replaced by Keerthy Suresh in 2014, considering her second Tamil film after Idhu Enna Maayam (2015). Her role was said to be a "feisty one", which included the character performing some street fights with other women. Soori was selected to play Sivakarthikeyan's co-star in the film, for the second time after Varuthapadaatha Vaalibar Sangam. Rajkiran was selected to play the role of Sivakarthikeyan's grandfather in the film. Samuthirakani was selected to play the main antagonist in the film. The supporting role cast also included G. Gnanasambandham, Achyuth Kumar, Deepa Ramanujam and Manobala.

Filming

Principal photography commenced on 25 August 2014. The film in its entirety, was extensively shot in Madurai. This also considered to be one of the films that shot in Madurai, which includes Nadodigal, Pandiya Naadu, Thoongaa Nagaram. After completion of the shoot in Madurai, the team moved on to Karaikudi on 30 October, and went ahead with a 40-day schedule, and planned for another 25-day schedule in Madurai again. The "Yennamma Ippadi Panreengalema" song sequences were shot in the busy streets of Madurai. Some song sequences were shot in Ooty. An Audi showroom scene shown as Audi Madurai, was actually shot in Coimbatore. The team takes a break on end-February 2015, after Keerthy Suresh fell ill. The shooting was completed in March 2015.

Soundtrack

The soundtrack to Rajinimurugan features ten tracks: five songs, a remix and karaoke versions of the tracks – all of them were composed by D. Imman. The lyrics for all the songs were penned by Yugabharathi. One song, "Yennamma Ippadi Panreengalema" was released on 25 May 2015 at the Super Singer World Tour, held at Suntec City in Singapore. The album was launched on 10 June 2015, at a formal event held in Taj Coromandel hotel and was telecasted live on Thanthi TV. The soundtrack opened to positive reviews and topped the music charts. After the film's release, three more songs were added as bonus tracks on 24 February 2016.

Marketing 
The first look poster of Rajinimurugan was released on 25 April 2015, at the 6th Vijay Awards. The official teaser of the film was released on 10 June 2015, during the audio launch of the film. The teaser received positive response from the audience. A few photocard designed posters, were unveiled on 21 August 2015, for the film's promotion. The official trailer of the film, was released on 4 September 2015, at midnight 12:00 a.m. on the official YouTube channel of Sony Music South. The second trailer of the film was released on 31 December 2015.

Delays
Rajinimurugan faced significant delays, upon its release, due to the financial problems faced by the production house. Initially, the film slated to release on 17 July 2015, coinciding with the Ramzan weekend. However, the release was postponed to avoid clash with Dhanush-starrer Maari, and was later scheduled to release on 17 September 2015, coinciding with Vinayagar Chathurthi. However, the financial disputes between the producers and distributors, led to postpone the release of the film on 1 October 2015, which was later delayed due to the release of Vijay-starrer Puli. The plans to release the film on 21 October 2015, during the Dusshera festival was also failed. Finally, the makers announced that the film will release on 4 December 2015. The makers went on with the film's promotion in November 2015, however, the release was pushed further, due to the 2015 South Indian Floods. Later, the film was scheduled to release on 14 January 2016, coinciding with the Pongal weekend, and also clashing with other releases Gethu, Kathakali and Thaarai Thappattai.

Financial issues 
During the production of Kamal Hassan's Uttama Villain (2015), the producers suffered losses as the Suriya-starrer Anjaan (2014), which was produced and directed by Lingusamy, bombed at the box office. Hence, in order to overcome the losses, Lingusamy desperately sold both Uttama Villain and Rajinimurugan, to Eros International. Lingusamy, also borrowed money from local distributors, to release the former. Since, Lingusamy doesn't have a huge amount to settle Eros, the film faced a delayed release, says the sources.

Reception

Critical response 
The Times of India, rated the film 3 out of 5 stars, stating that "The film is overlong with innumerable songs and comic scenes that could have been left at the editing table. It is also utterly unambitious, content with clearing its low bar, but this unpretentiousness is also what makes it work to an extent." Behindwoods gave the film 2.5 out of 5 stars stating, "Rajini Murugan is a safe bet to bank your money on if you want to watch a film with no expectation but just to spend your two and a half hours laughing." The Guardian rated it 3 out of 5 stars, saying, "This long-gestating slice of fun about the successes of the world's least ambitious individual is a likable, irreverent ride". The Hindu wrote that "Rajini Murugan makes it amply evident that Sivakarthikeyan, as he has done earlier in his career, is quite capable of making a below-average script seem average, sometimes, above-average even. Perhaps that's why dozens of little stars come together to form the title."

Sify rated the film 4 out of 5 stars, stating that "Rajini Murugan is a tailor made festival film, which is sure to enthrall and entertain the masses. The film's director Ponram has packaged the film in such a way that audiences will leave the movie hall with a big smile and forget all their worries. Thanks to the brilliant chemistry between the comedy-duo Sivakarthikeyan and Soori, the film is a laugh riot which holds no pretensions." S. Sarswathi from Rediff.com rated 2.5 out of 5 stars, and reviewed "Director Ponram's Rajini Murugan has no real plot, nor any remarkable characters or poignant moments but good music, vibrant visuals and spontaneity and charm of its lead actor makes it a fun watch". Bollywoodlife rated the film 3 out of 5 stars, and stated that "While the film has its faults, the film is a decent family entertainer with some clean hilarious comedy. Watch it purely for Sivakarthikeyan and Soori's antics and you will leave the theatre with a smile on your face!" Indiaglitz rated the movie 2.5/5 stating, "An entertainer that can be watched mainly for Sivakarthikeyan and Soori." Studioflicks rated the film 2.75 out of 5, stating "Rajini Murugan is a neat entertainer for family audiences, where they can come relaxed and enjoy show grabbing their favourite piece of snacks."

In contrast, Gauthaman Baskaran for the Hindustan Times, rated 1 out of 5 stars, and reviewed it as "Hackneyed plotlines, silly jokes and endless song-and-dance--that is much of Tamil film industry's lot. Sadly, Rajini Murugan falls in that lot. A big bore." The Indian Express reviewed it as "Even with its predictable storyline, Sivakarthikeyan makes the film work, and only he can save a film like this." Silverscreen reviewed the film as "Rajini Murugan is an assembly line. Formerly managed by M Rajesh, now run by Ponram. The saving grace might have been a competent antagonist. But, no. It's almost an insult that one of our best actors today – Samuthirakani – is reduced to a joke. Rajini Murugan gives us a hero who seems to be a parody, and a spineless jokey riff for a villain."

Box office 
The film collected ₹4.5 crores on the first day, and ₹15 crores on the first weekend, following by ₹24 crores on the first week. The film grossed ₹43 crores in India, while it collected ₹51 crores worldwide, and became a commercial success.

References

External links
 

2016 films
Films shot in Madurai
2010s masala films
Tamil films remade in other languages
2010s Tamil-language films
Films scored by D. Imman